Miss World 1953, the 3rd edition of the Miss World pageant, was held on 19 October 1953 at the Lyceum Ballroom in London, United Kingdom. 15 contestants competed for the crown. May-Louise Flodin of Sweden crowned her successor Denise Perrier of France. At this ceremony, Perrier was given an official sash, bouquet and trophy, making the first Miss World winner to wear a Miss World sash, sponsored by Mecca Dancing in 1953. The second runner up Marina Papaelia from Egypt was screaming when she was announced third place.

Results

Contestants

  - Manel Illangkoon
  - Ingrid Andersen
  - Marina Papaelia
  - Maija-Riitta Tuomaala
  - Denise Perrier
  - Wilma Kanders
  - Brenda Mee
  - Alexandra Ladikou
  - Yvonne Meijer
  - Havatzelet Dror
  - Elizabeth Chovisky
  - Synnøve Gulbrandsen
  - Ingrid Johansson
  - Odette Michel
  - Mary Kemp Griffith

Notes

Debuts

Withdrawals

Did not Complete
  - Lore Felger (Invited but not arrived due to lack of sponsors.)
  - Sepia Degehet (Sponsors sent her to Miss Europe.)
  - Mary Murphy (Became ill shortly before travelling.)
  - Marcella Mariani† (Gave up at last minute because of the invitation to work in the film.)
  - Hanya Beydoun (Invited but not arrived due to lack of sponsors.)

Replaced
  - Antigone Costanda (Can't complete for unknown reason so her 1st runner-up Marina Papaelia complete instead.)
  - Syliviane Carpentier (Gave up and work on her wedding plan.)

References

External links
 Miss World official website

Miss World
1953 in London
1953 beauty pageants
Beauty pageants in the United Kingdom
October 1953 events in the United Kingdom